Samuel Robinson (1794–1884) was an English industrialist and scholar of Persian who founded the Dukinfield Village Library in 1833.

Robinson was a Unitarian, and is often called the "foremost promoter of education in the district" by the people of Dukinfield.

References

External links

1794 births
1884 deaths
19th-century English educators
English philanthropists
People from Dukinfield
19th-century British philanthropists
19th-century English businesspeople